Pnyxia scabiei, the potato scab gnat, is a species of dark-winged fungus gnats, insects in the family Sciaridae.

References

Further reading

 

Sciaridae
Articles created by Qbugbot
Insects described in 1895